The US Armed Forces use a lot of abbreviations to indicate the type of equipment fielded.
The abbreviation S- is used for shelters, mostly rigid wall shelters (RWS), though in the past some other shelters (tents) got this designation.
Rigid Wall Shelters are defined by the US army as: pre-sized structures (non-expandable and expandable shelters) that are transported by land, sea, or air. These shelters require minimal site preparation and no specialized set-up. 
Soft Wall Shelters are defined by the US army as: air supported and frame supported fabric structures that are transported and then erected or assembled on site 
Hybrid Shelters are defined by the US army as: a combination of rigid and soft wall shelters that are transported and erected or assembled on site (1), (2), (3).
The army uses in addition extensions as A/G, B/G,C/G, /G and so on to indicate the kind of shelter. The first letters indicating the further developed versions of the shelter. The second letter behind the slash indicates the type of use, corresponding with JETDS system. E.g. /G means use on the ground, /U means general use etc.

List

References

1. Joint Committee on Tactical Shelters (JOCOTAS)
2. US Army CECOM HISTORICAL OFFICE listing of technical manuals
3. List of applicable publications (LOAP) for B-46 equipment
4 TM 11-487-C-1 1965
5 FM 24-24 CHAPTER 6
6 Document Center Inc.
7 Litton: Tactical Air Operations Central Hardware (Marine Corps)
8 Reference Manual on Shelters 1972
9 PRINCIPAL TECHNICAL CHARACTERISTICS OF US MARINE CORPS COMMUNICATION-ELECTRONIC EQUIPMENT
10 Department of Defense Index of Specifications and Standards

United States Department of War publications
United States Army publications
United States Army lists
United States Army equipment